is a Prefectural Natural Park in northern Hokkaidō, Japan. Established in 1968, the park spans the municipalities of Esashi, Hamatonbetsu, and Sarufutsu.

See also
 National Parks of Japan

References

External links 
  Map of Natural Parks of Hokkaidō
  Map of North Okhotsk Prefectural Natural Park*

Parks and gardens in Hokkaido
Protected areas established in 1968
1968 establishments in Japan